= Junam Chunduru =

Zoonamchunduru
- Village
- Interactive map of Zoonamchunduru
- Location within Andhra Pradesh
- Coordinates: 16°14′11″N 80°20′45″E
- Country: India
- State: Andhra Pradesh
- District: Guntur
- Elevation: 22 m (72 ft)

Languages
  - Official: Telugu
- Time zone: UTC+5:30 (IST)
- PIN: 522019
- Vehicle registration: AP7

Zoonamchunduru is a village in the state of Andhra Pradesh, India.

== Geography ==
Zoonamchunduru is located at 16.3008°N 80.4428°E.
